The Adam Hilton House is a historic house located at 6073 Leesome Lane in Guilderland, Albany County, New York.

Description and history 
It was built about 1800 and is a substantial, two-story stone farmhouse, five bays wide with a gable roof. The wood-framed addition and front porch were added about 1860.

It was listed on the National Register of Historic Places on November 10, 1982.

References

Houses on the National Register of Historic Places in New York (state)
Houses completed in 1800
Houses in Albany County, New York
National Register of Historic Places in Albany County, New York
1800 establishments in New York (state)